The Seven Slavic tribes, or the Seven clans were a union of Slavic tribes in the Danubian Plain, that was established around the middle of the 7th century and took part in the formation of the First Bulgarian Empire together with the Bulgars in 680−681.

Since its establishment it faced attacks of the Byzantine Empire. The Bulgars crossed the Danube and in the 670's they concluded an alliance with the Slavic Union. Theophanes writes that the Bulgars became masters of the Slavs. The Slavic Union recognized the sovereignty of Khan Asparukh and together, in the spring of 681, they won a major victory over the Byzantines.

In the late 7th century the Seven tribes were assigned the defence of the newly-established Bulgar Khanate's western and northwestern border (the Iskar River up to its mouth in the Danube) against Avar raids, as well as some of the passes of the Balkan Mountains, whereas the Severi, whose possible participation in the union is not clear, would guard the eastern part of the mountains. 

The Seven Slavic tribes, together with other Slavic tribes of the Bulgarian Empire, gradually formed the Bulgarian ethnicity in the 9th century due to the Christianization of Bulgaria under Boris I and the preceding administrative reforms that deprived them of their autonomy and self-government through the Comitatus (First Bulgarian State).

The Asparuch Bulgars, who were not numerous, settled in the Balkans with a single migration wave, which Michael the Syrian described as numbering 10,000. Therefore, they gradually were assimilated into the Slavic culture, until by the 10th century they had adopted the Slavic language, with the Bulgar language going extinct in the kingdom.

See also
List of Medieval Slavic tribes

Notes

First Bulgarian Empire
South Slavic tribes
Slavic tribes in Thrace and Moesia